Dale Watson may refer to:

 Dale Watson (FBI), former Assistant Director for the Counterterrorism Division of the FBI
 Dale Watson (singer) (born 1962), American country singer, guitarist, songwriter and author
Dale Watson (Jamaican footballer) from Sporting Central Academy
Dale Watson (ice hockey) from List of All-ECAC Hockey Teams
Dale Watson (speedway rider) from 1986 Individual Speedway World Championship